The Tulip Festival is held in Albany, New York every spring at Washington Park. It stems from when Mayor Erastus Corning 2nd got a city ordinance passed declaring the tulip as Albany's official flower on July 1, 1948. In addition, he sent a request to Queen Wilhelmina of the Netherlands to name a variety as Albany's tulip. On July 11, 1948 her reply was "Her Majesty gladly accepts the invitation to designate a tulip as the official flower of Albany." She picked the variety "Orange Wonder", an 18-inch tall tulip that is orange-shaded with a scarlet toward the center, it is a slow-grower and relatively rare. The first Tulip Fest was celebrated the next year on May 14, 1949 with opening ceremonies still carried on today as tradition, such as the sweeping of State Street and the crowning of a Tulip Queen. In 1997 to commemorate the 50th anniversary of the festival the state of New York designated Albany as the "I Love New York Spring Destination". Also for the 50th anniversary a descendant variety of the "Wonder Orange" tulip was found in the Netherlands, and the new variety was named "City of Albany". The African-American tradition of Pinksterfest, whose origins are traced back even further to Dutch festivities, was later incorporated into the Tulip Fest. Since 1998 the Tulip Fest has included the Mother of the Year award.

Photo gallery

See also
Tulip Festival

References

External links

Tulip Festival

Festivals in New York (state)
Culture of Albany, New York
Tourist attractions in Albany, New York
Flower festivals in the United States